Paul Samuel Reinsch (June 10, 1869 – January 26, 1923), was an American political scientist and diplomat. He played an influential role in developing the field of international relations.

Career overview
Reinsch was born in Milwaukee, Wisconsin of German-American parents. He graduated from the University of Wisconsin in 1892, attended the school of law there, and after graduating in 1894, was admitted to the bar and practiced law in Milwaukee for some time.

While Reinsch was at the University of Wisconsin, Richard Ely founded the School of Economics, Political Science and History.

He returned to the University of Wisconsin for additional schooling in 1895, enrolled as a PhD student in history and political science. He earned a Ph.D. in political science under Frederick Jackson Turner in 1898. He was employed there as an assistant professor of political science in 1899. He reportedly established the first course in international politics at the University of Wisconsin in 1899. In 1913 he became the United States Minister to China, a position he held until 1919. Before and after that date he served as a delegate to various international conferences.

World Politics at the End of the Nineteenth Century 
In 1900, Reinsch published World Politics at the End of the Nineteenth Century. The book, which focuses on great power disputes over China, German imperialism and American expansionism, has been characterized as an early writing within the field of political science that recognized that international politics were shaped by unique economic, political and intellectual forces. In the book, Reinsch identifies a shift from nationalism to national imperialism where the new desire of European nation-states is to control as much territory as possible. Reinsch criticizes national imperialism on the basis of its threat to world peace, the subjugation of indigenous peoples and its diversion of focus from domestic reform. However, Reinsch was in favor of expansionism on the grounds of a "white man's burden."

Publications
(1899). The Common Law in the Early American Colonies.
(1900). World Politics at the End of the Nineteenth Century.
(1902). Colonial Government.
(1905). Colonial Administration.
(1907). American Legislatures and Legislative Methods.
(1909). Readings on American Federal Government.
(1909). Civil Government.
(1911). Readings on American State Government.
(1911). Intellectual and Political Currents in the Far East.
(1911). Public International Unions.
(1922). An American Diplomat in China.

Selected articles
 "A Parliament for China," The Atlantic, December 1, 1909.
 "Intellectual Life in Japan," The Atlantic, October 1910.

He was a contributor to the New International Encyclopedia.

Notes

External links
 
 Works by Paul Samuel Reinsch, at Hathi Trust
 Works by Paul Samuel Reinsch, at JSTOR

Ambassadors of the United States to China
University of Wisconsin–Madison alumni
University of Wisconsin–Madison faculty
Scientists from Milwaukee
American people of German descent
Writers from Milwaukee
1869 births
1923 deaths
American male writers
American political scientists